Palestinian tunnels may refer to:
 Gaza Strip smuggling tunnels, passages along the border between Gaza Strip and Egypt
 Palestinian tunnel warfare in the Gaza Strip, military tunnels employed by the Palestinians in their warfare against Israel